The family Lymantriidae contains the "tussock moths", of which 11 have been recorded in Great Britain:

 Laelia coenosa, reed tussock — extinct
 Orgyia recens, scarce vapourer — east-central (Red Data Book) ‡
 Orgyia antiqua, vapourer — throughout
 Dicallomera fascelina, dark tussock — south, west-central & north-east (localized)
 Calliteara pudibunda, pale tussock — south & central
 Euproctis chrysorrhoea, brown-tail — south, south-east & east-central (localized)
 Euproctis similis, yellow-tail — south, central & north
 Leucoma salicis, white satin — south, east-central, west-central & north (localized)
 Arctornis l-nigrum, black v moth — immigrant & transitory resident
 Lymantria monacha, black arches — south & central (localized)
 Lymantria dispar, gypsy moth — immigrant (formerly resident)

Species listed in the 2007 UK Biodiversity Action Plan (BAP) are indicated by a double-dagger symbol (‡)—species so listed for research purposes only are also indicated with an asterisk (‡*).

See also
List of moths of Great Britain (overview)
Family lists: Hepialidae, Cossidae, Zygaenidae, Limacodidae, Sesiidae, Lasiocampidae, Saturniidae, Endromidae, Drepanidae, Thyatiridae, Geometridae, Sphingidae, Notodontidae, Thaumetopoeidae, Lymantriidae, Arctiidae, Ctenuchidae, Nolidae, Noctuidae and Micromoths

References 

 Waring, Paul, Martin Townsend and Richard Lewington (2003) Field Guide to the Moths of Great Britain and Ireland. British Wildlife Publishing, Hook, UK. .

Moths
Britain